Ulysses Doubleday (August 31, 1824 – February 11, 1893) was a Union Army colonel during the American Civil War. In 1866 he was nominated and confirmed for appointment to the grade of brevet brigadier general of volunteers, to rank from March 13, 1865.

Early life 
Ulysses Doubleday was  born in Auburn, New York, on August 31, 1824. He was described as having 'blue eyes, brown hair, and a fair complexion'. He was the younger brother of Union Army Major General Abner Doubleday and the son of congressman and War of 1812 veteran Ulysses F. Doubleday and Hester Donnelly. Before the Civil War, he was a banker and broker.

Civil War 
On January 23, 1862, Ulysses Doubleday was appointed a major and commander of the 4th New York Heavy Artillery. He became an aide-de-camp for his brother in August 1862. He was discharged on March 7, 1863. He returned to service as lieutenant colonel of the 3rd United States Colored Infantry Regiment, October 2, 1863. He was appointed to the command of the Artillery Brigade in the District of Florida, Department of the South, in April 1864. He resigned October 5, 1864 and was appointed colonel of the 45th United States Colored Infantry Regiment, October 8, 1864. He immediately took command of Brigade 2, Division 3, X Corps (Union Army), Army of the James and served in that office until December 3, 1864 except for October 29 - November 6. On December 3, 1864, Doubleday took command of Brigade 2, Division 2, XXV Corps (Union Army), Army of the James until May 18, 1865. He moved with this brigade, division and corps to the Department of Texas from June 13, 1865 until some date in July 1865. He was discharged from the volunteers on September 12, 1865.

Post-War 
On January 13, 1866, President Andrew Johnson nominated Doubleday for appointment to the grade of brevet brigadier general of volunteers, to rank from March 13, 1865, and the United States Senate confirmed the appointment on March 12, 1866.

After the war he was a member of the New York Stock Exchange, the Union League, and the Saint Nicholas Society of New York. He later retired to a large farm in Asheville, North Carolina.

Ulysses Doubleday died in Tryon, North Carolina on February 11, 1893. He was interred at Woodlawn Cemetery (Bronx, New York).

See also

List of American Civil War brevet generals (Union)

Notes

References
 Eicher, John H., and David J. Eicher. Civil War High Commands. Stanford, CA: Stanford University Press, 2001. .
Smith Bartlett, Joan. Abner Doubleday: His Life and Times. Xlibris Corporation LLC.

External links

Union Army generals
People of New York (state) in the American Civil War
1824 births
1893 deaths